Flight of the Icarus, formerly known as Guns of Icarus or Guns of Icarus Classic, is a steampunk-themed tower defense game by American independent developer Muse Games.

Gameplay 
The game takes place exclusively aboard the trading zeppelin Icarus, where the player's task is to defend the Icarus using gun turrets and by manually repairing damage sustained under fire. As the player progresses through the story, more turrets and armor upgrades can be unlocked to help combat the increasingly difficult waves of enemies encountered at the later stages of the game.

Reception 
GameSpot gave the original game a score of 4/10. PC Gamer gave it 44/100.

Online version 

In 2012, Muse Games launched a Kickstarter campaign to fund a new version of the game, Guns of Icarus Online. The campaign succeeded on February 21 with a total of $35,237 raised, where $10,000 was sought. The game held a closed beta for Kickstarter backers and pre-orderers.

References 

Browser games
Windows games
Indie video games
Steampunk video games
MacOS games
2010 video games
Multiplayer and single-player video games
Video games developed in the United States
Muse Games games